Matías Mariatti (born 26 January 1997) is an Argentine professional footballer who plays as a defender for Ferro Carril Oeste.

Career
Mariatti's career started with Ferro Carril Oeste, who he joined in 2013. After appearing on the club's bench for a 2016–17 Primera B Nacional fixture with Almagro in July 2017, Mariatti made his professional debut on 7 February 2018 during a 3–3 draw away to All Boys. Another appearance followed a month later against Los Andes, in a campaign which Ferro finished in eighteenth place.

Career statistics
.

References

External links

1997 births
Living people
Place of birth missing (living people)
Argentine footballers
Association football defenders
Primera Nacional players
Ferro Carril Oeste footballers